Kofa, also historically known as Kofa Station,  is a populated place situated in Yuma County, Arizona, United States. It is located in the northern San Cristobal Valley, along the Union Pacific Railroad's Roll Industrial Lead.

The town, like the nearby hills of the same name, was derived from the acronym for "King of Arizona", which had been coined by Colonel Eugene Ives. Ives had purchased a nearby mine from Charles Eichelberg for $250,000, which he named the King of Arizona Mine. A post office was established in the town in 1900, with Lewis W. Alexander as its postmaster.

References

External links
 Kofa – Ghost Town of the Month at azghosttowns.com

Populated places in Yuma County, Arizona
Ghost towns in Arizona